Ashok Kumar was an Indian actor who was active from 1934 to 1997.

He was regarded as one of the greatest actor of his era. He was the eldest in the Ganguly / Kumar sibling ( Ashok Kumar, Anoop Kumar , Kishore Kumar and (Sati Rani Devi).

Filmography

Television

References

Male actor filmographies
Indian filmographies